José Francisco Yunes Zorrilla (born 25 September 1969) is a Mexican politician affiliated with the PRI. He currently serves as Senator of the LXII Legislature of the Mexican Congress representing Veracruz. He also served as Deputy from 2003 until 2006 and again from 2009 until 2012.

References

1969 births
Living people
Politicians from Veracruz
Members of the Senate of the Republic (Mexico)
Members of the Chamber of Deputies (Mexico)
Institutional Revolutionary Party politicians
Mexican people of Lebanese descent
20th-century Mexican politicians
21st-century Mexican politicians
Instituto Tecnológico Autónomo de México alumni
Members of the Congress of Veracruz
Senators of the LXII and LXIII Legislatures of Mexico